Dipropylene glycol is a mixture of three isomeric chemical compounds, 4-oxa-2,6-heptandiol, 2-(2-hydroxy-propoxy)-propan-1-ol, and 2-(2-hydroxy-1-methyl-ethoxy)-propan-1-ol. It is a colorless, nearly odorless liquid with a high boiling point and low toxicity.

Uses
Dipropylene glycol finds many uses as a plasticizer, an intermediate in industrial chemical reactions, as a polymerization initiator or monomer, and as a solvent. Its low toxicity and solvent properties make it an ideal additive for perfumes and skin and hair care products. It is also a common ingredient in commercial fog fluid, used in entertainment industry fog machines.

References

Cosmetics chemicals
Monomers
Plasticizers
Diols
Glycol ethers